Kensington North was a parliamentary constituency centred on the Kensington district of west London.  It returned one Member of Parliament (MP)  to the House of Commons of the Parliament of the United Kingdom.

The constituency was created for the 1885 general election, and abolished for the February 1974 general election.

Boundaries 

1918–1974: The Royal Borough of Kensington wards of Golborne, Norland, Pembridge, and St Charles.

Members of Parliament

Election results

Elections in the 1880s

Elections in the 1890s

Elections in the 1900s

Elections in the 1910s

Election in the 1920s

Election in the 1930s

Election in the 1940s

Elections in the 1950s

Elections in the 1960s

Election in the 1970s

References 

 British Parliamentary Election Results 1885-1918, compiled and edited by F.W.S. Craig (Macmillan Press 1974)
 Debrett’s Illustrated Heraldic and Biographical House of Commons and the Judicial Bench 1886
 Debrett’s House of Commons and the Judicial Bench 1901
 Debrett’s House of Commons and the Judicial Bench 1918

Parliamentary constituencies in London (historic)
Constituencies of the Parliament of the United Kingdom established in 1885
Constituencies of the Parliament of the United Kingdom disestablished in 1974